Bruno Petroni (October 16, 1941 in Acqualagna – August 15, 2014) was an Italian professional football player.

Honours
 Coppa Italia top scorer: 1964/65 (3 goals).

References

External links
 Career summary by playerhistory.com

1941 births
2014 deaths
Italian footballers
Italy under-21 international footballers
Serie A players
Serie B players
Inter Milan players
Catania S.S.D. players
Atalanta B.C. players
Genoa C.F.C. players
Association football forwards
Mediterranean Games gold medalists for Italy
Mediterranean Games medalists in football
Competitors at the 1963 Mediterranean Games